Vali Maleki is an Iranian politician and food industry engineer. He was born in Meshginshahr, Ardabil province. He was a member of the seventh legislative election and Maleki is MP of tenth Islamic Consultative Assembly from the electorate of Meshginshahr.

References

Living people
1961 births
Deputies of Meshginshahr
People from Meshginshahr
Members of the 7th Islamic Consultative Assembly
Members of the 10th Islamic Consultative Assembly
University of Tabriz alumni
Executives of Construction Party politicians